

Notes

Awards established in 1980
Argentine awards
Argentine film awards
Argentina culture-related lists